Odites atalanta is a moth in the family Depressariidae. It was described by Ferdinand Le Cerf in 1934. It is found in Morocco.

References

Moths described in 1934
Odites